Adenophorus tamariscinus, the wahine noho mauna, is a species of fern endemic to the US state of Hawaii.

References

External links
 
 

Polypodiaceae
Endemic flora of Hawaii
Native ferns of Hawaii
Flora without expected TNC conservation status